Günther Stapenhorst (25 June 1883 – 4 February 1976) was a German film producer. He produced more than 50 films between 1927 and 1960. He was a member of the jury at the 12th Berlin International Film Festival.

Selected filmography

 The Blue Mouse (1928)
 Yacht of the Seven Sins (1928)
 Because I Love You (1928)
 Her Dark Secret (1929)
 The Model from Montparnasse (1929)
 The Convict from Istanbul (1929)
 The Flute Concert of Sanssouci (1930)
 The Immortal Vagabond (1930)
 A Student's Song of Heidelberg (1930)
 Hocuspocus (1930)
 The Little Escapade (1931)
 Ronny (1931)
 Emil and the Detectives (1931)
 The Beautiful Adventure (1932)
 Morgenrot (1933)
 Waltz War (1933)
 Refugees (1933)
 Court Waltzes (1933)
 Season in Cairo (1933)
 Night in May (1934)
 The Young Baron Neuhaus (1934)
 Amphitryon (1935)
 The Great Barrier (1937)
 Two Times Lotte (1950)
 The White Adventure  (1952)
 The White Horse Inn (1952)
 Alraune (1952)
 Anna Louise and Anton (1953)
 The Last Waltz (1953)
 The Immortal Vagabond (1953)
 To Be Without Worries (1953)
 Cabaret (1954)
 Ballerina (1956)
 The Beggar Student (1956)
 Restless Night (1958)

References

External links

1883 births
1976 deaths
People from Guebwiller
People from Alsace-Lorraine
German film producers